Lee Seon-bae (born 2 June 1939) is a former South Korean cyclist. He competed in the individual road race and team time trial events at the 1964 Summer Olympics.

References

External links
 

1939 births
Living people
South Korean male cyclists
Olympic cyclists of South Korea
Cyclists at the 1964 Summer Olympics
People from Yesan County
Asian Games medalists in cycling
Cyclists at the 1966 Asian Games
Medalists at the 1966 Asian Games
Asian Games gold medalists for South Korea
Asian Games silver medalists for South Korea
Sportspeople from South Chungcheong Province